The 2009–10 Missouri Tigers men's basketball team represented the University of Missouri in the 2009-10 NCAA Division I men's basketball season. Their Head Coach was Mike Anderson, who was in his 4th year at Missouri. The team played its home games at Mizzou Arena in Columbia, Missouri and they are members of the Big 12 Conference. The Tigers finished the season 23–11, 10–6 in Big 12 play and they lost in the first round of the 2010 Big 12 men's basketball tournament. They received an at–large bid to the 2010 NCAA Division I men's basketball tournament, earning a 10 seed in the East Region. They upset 7 seed Clemson in the first round before falling to 2 seed and AP #6 West Virginia in the second round.

Roster

Schedule 

|-
!colspan=12 style=|Exhibition 

|-
!colspan=12 style=|Non-conference regular season

|-
!colspan=12 style=|Big 12 Regular Season

|-
!colspan=12 style=|Big 12 Tournament 

|-
!colspan=12 style=|NCAA Tournament

References 

Missouri
Missouri Tigers men's basketball seasons
Missouri
2009 in sports in Missouri
Tiger